Duldig is a surname. Notable people with the surname include:

 Eva Duldig (born 1938), Austrian-born Australian and Dutch tennis player, author
 Karl Duldig (1902–1986), Austrian-Australian sculptor
Lance Duldig (1922–1998), Australian cricketer 
Slawa Duldig (1902–1975), Polish-born Austrian-Australian inventor, artist, interior designer, and teacher

Jewish surnames